The Twentse Derby  is a Dutch football derby between FC Twente and Heracles Almelo.

Statistics

Results

All time goal scorers

References

FC Twente
Heracles Almelo
Football derbies in the Netherlands